Orthetrum angustiventre is a species of dragonfly in the family Libellulidae. It is found in Angola, Benin, Burkina Faso, Cameroon, Ivory Coast, Gambia, Ghana, Guinea, Guinea-Bissau, Kenya, Liberia, Mali, Nigeria, Senegal, Sierra Leone, Sudan, Togo, Uganda, Zambia, and possibly Tanzania. Its natural habitat is subtropical or tropical moist lowland forests.

References

Libellulidae
Insects described in 1842
Taxonomy articles created by Polbot